Astorre Manfredi may refer to:

Astorre I Manfredi (1345–1405), Italian condottiero
Astorre II Manfredi (1412–1468), lord of Imola, and of Faenza
Astorre III Manfredi (1485–1502), lord Faenza
Astorre IV Manfredi (1470–1509)